Remains of the Day, released on April 7, 2010 on Playground Music, is the third album by the Finnish alternative rock band End of You.

Track listing
 End of You - 4:07
 Catching the Sky - 4:13
 Just Dance - 3:20
 Star Parade - 4:02
 September Sun - 4:14
 Hey My Enemies - 3:41
 Forgive and Forget - 4:30
 Breaking Bed - 5:37
 Crystal - 4:18
 Who Needs to Sleep - 4:32

Singles
 Star Parade (released on March 8, 2010)

Videos
 Star Parade
 September Sun

Credits 
 Jami Pietilä - vocals
 Jani Karppanen - guitar
 Joni Borodavkin - keyboards
 Otto Mäkelä - drums
 Marko Borodavkin - bass

2010 albums